The 2006 Artistic Gymnastics World Cup Final was held in São Paulo, Brazil in 2006. This was the fifth edition of the World Cup Final. From 2005 to 2006, a series of qualifying events were held, culminating in a final event, the World Cup Final. The different stages, sometimes referred to as World Cup Qualifiers, mostly served the purpose of awarding points to individual gymnasts and groups according to their placements. These points would be added up over the two-year period to qualify a limited number of athletes to the biennial World Cup Final event.

Medal winners

References

2006
Artistic Gymnastics World Cup
International gymnastics competitions hosted by Brazil
2006 in Brazilian sport